Trichoplusia florina  is a moth of the family Noctuidae. it is found in Madagascar and in Réunion.

See also
 List of moths of Madagascar
 List of moths of Réunion

References

Trichoplusia
Moths described in 1852
Moths of Madagascar
Moths of Réunion